Corinna Susan Kollath (born 21 April 1976) is a Scottish-born German theoretical and computational physicist whose research involves ultracold gases, the many-body problem, and out-of-equilibrium low dimensional correlated systems in quantum mechanics. She is a professor at the University of Bonn

Education and career
Kollath was born on 21 April 1976 in Stirling. She studied physics at the University of Cologne, with a year at the University of Glasgow where she earned a bachelor's degree in mathematics and physics in 1998, with first-class honours. Returning to Cologne, she completed a diploma in 2001 under the supervision of Martin Zirnbauer.

She was a postdoctoral researcher at the University of Geneva and the École polytechnique in France, in 2008 continuing at the École polytechnique as a researcher for the French National Centre for Scientific Research (CNRS). She took an associate professorship at the University of Geneva in 2011 and in 2013 moved to her present position as a full professor of theoretical quantum physics at the University of Bonn.

Recognition
In 2010 the Göttingen Academy of Sciences and Humanities gave her their physics prize.

In 2020 she was named a Fellow of the American Physical Society (APS), after a nomination from the APS Division of Atomic, Molecular and Optical Physics, "for studies of low dimensional correlated systems, in particular out of equilibrium, using a combination of analytic and novel numerical approaches".

References

1976 births
Living people
People from Stirling
German physicists
German women physicists
University of Cologne alumni
Alumni of the University of Glasgow
RWTH Aachen University alumni
French National Centre for Scientific Research scientists
Academic staff of the University of Geneva
Academic staff of the University of Bonn
Fellows of the American Physical Society